Ardin Dallku (born 1 November 1994) is a Kosovan professional footballer who plays as a centre-back for Kosovan club Dukagjini.

Club career

Vorskla Poltava
On 10 January 2012, Dallku signed to Ukrainian club Vorskla Poltava. On 1 July 2016, he promoted to the first team and on 10 December 2016, he made his debut in a 0–1 away win against Volyn Lutsk after being named in the starting line-up.

Shkëndija
On 24 October 2019, Dallku signed a precontract with Macedonian First Football League club Shkëndija and this transfer would become legally effective in January 2020. On 1 March 2020, he made his debut in a 4–1 home win against Makedonija Gjorče Petrov after being named in the starting line-up.

International career
On 28 August 2017, Dallku received a call-up from Kosovo for the 2018 FIFA World Cup qualification matches against Croatia and Finland. On 13 November 2017, he making his debut with Kosovo in friendly match against Latvia after being named in the starting line-up.

Personal life
Dallku was born in Vushtrri, Kosovo and is the son of former  Yugoslavia international Sabit Dallku and is the younger brother of former Albania international Armend Dallku. He holds Kosovan, Albanian, and Serbian passports.

Career statistics

Club

International

References

External links
 
 
 

1994 births
Living people
Sportspeople from Vushtrri
Kosovan footballers
Kosovo international footballers
Kosovan expatriate footballers
Expatriate footballers in Ukraine
Kosovan expatriate sportspeople in Ukraine
Kosovan expatriate sportspeople in North Macedonia
Association football central defenders
Ukrainian Premier League players
FC Vorskla Poltava players
Macedonian First Football League players
KF Shkëndija players
Football Superleague of Kosovo players
SC Gjilani players